De Furtivis Literarum Notis (On the Secret Symbols of Letters) is a 1563 book on cryptography written by Giambattista della Porta.

The book includes three sets of cypher discs for coding and decoding messages and a substitution cipher improving on the work of Al-Qalqashandi.

References

1563 books
Cryptography books
Non-fiction books